Decamethylcyclopentasiloxane, also known as D5 and D5, is an organosilicon compound with the formula . It is a colorless and odorless liquid that is slightly volatile.

Use 
The compound is classified as a cyclomethicone. Such fluids are commonly used in cosmetics, such as deodorants, sunblocks, hair sprays and skin care products. It is becoming more common in hair conditioners, as it makes the hair easier to brush without breakage. It is also used as part of silicone-based personal lubricants. D5 is considered an emollient.
In Canada, among the volume used in consumer products approximately 70% were for antiperspirants and 20% for hair care products.
10,000–100,000 tonnes per year of D5 is manufactured and/or imported in the European Economic Area. Atmospheric emissions of D5 in the Northern Hemisphere were estimated to 30,000 tonnes per year.

Production and polymerization
Commercially D5 is produced from dimethyldichlorosilane. Hydrolysis of the dichloride produces a mixture of cyclic dimethylsiloxanes and polydimethylsiloxane. From this mixture, the cyclic siloxanes including D5 can be removed by distillation. In the presence of a strong base such as KOH, the polymer/ring mixture is equilibrated, allowing complete conversion to the more volatile cyclic siloxanes:

where n is a positive integer.
D4 and D5 are also precursors to the polymer. The catalyst is again KOH.

Safety and environmental considerations 
The LD50 for D5 in rats is >50 g/kg.

The environmental impacts of D5 and D4 have attracted attention because these compounds are pervasive. Cyclic siloxanes have been detected in some species of aquatic life. A scientific review in Canada has determined that “Siloxane D5 does not pose a danger to the environment” and a scientific assessment of D5 by the Australian government stated, "the direct risks to aquatic life from exposure to these chemicals at expected surface water concentrations are not likely to be significant." However, in the European Union, D5 was characterized as a substance of very high concern (SVHC) due to its PBT and vPvB properties and was thus included in the candidate list for authorisation. Since 31 January 2020, D5 cannot be placed on the market in the European Union in wash-off cosmetic products in a concentration equal to or greater than 0.1 % by weight.

See also
 Hexamethylcyclotrisiloxane (D3)
 Octamethylcyclotetrasiloxane (D4)

References

External links 
 
 

Cosmetics chemicals
Organosilicon compounds
PBT substances
Personal lubricants
Siloxanes